Antonello Steardo (born 27 August 1958) is an Italian former water polo player. He competed at the 1980 Summer Olympics, the 1984 Summer Olympics and the 1988 Summer Olympics.

See also
 List of World Aquatics Championships medalists in water polo

References

External links
 

1958 births
Living people
Italian male water polo players
Olympic water polo players of Italy
Water polo players at the 1980 Summer Olympics
Water polo players at the 1984 Summer Olympics
Water polo players at the 1988 Summer Olympics
Water polo players from Genoa